is a railway station in Shimizu-ku, Shizuoka City, Shizuoka Prefecture, Japan, operated by Central Japan Railway Company (JR Tōkai).

Lines
Okitsu Station is served by the Tōkaidō Main Line, and is located 164.3 kilometers from the starting point of the line at Tokyo Station.

Station layout
Okitsu Station has a single side platform serving Track 1 and an island platform serving Track 2 and Track 3, connected to the station building by a footbridge. Track 3 is used for terminating services arriving from east and west, and also for services departing in both directions. The station building has automated ticket machines, TOICA automated turnstiles and a staffed ticket office.

Platforms

Adjacent stations

|-
!colspan=5|Central Japan Railway Company

Station history
Okitsu Station was opened on 1 February 1889 when the section of the Tōkaidō Main Line connecting Shizuoka with Kōzu was completed. It is located near the site of Okitsu-juku on the old Tōkaidō. The area quickly developed into a summer seaside resort for the aristocracy, politicians and noted literary figures in the Meiji and Taishō periods. A noted resident of Okitsu was the genrō Saionji Kinmochi, whose practice was to order express trains to make a special unscheduled stop at Okitsu Station whenever he wanted to travel. The station building was rebuilt in 1930 and in 1981.

Between 1926 and 1964 there was a station called Sodeshi Station was situated  towards Shimizu Station, operating in the summer months to cater for beachgoers. Sodeshi Station closed in 1971.

Station numbering was introduced to the section of the Tōkaidō Line operated JR Central in March 2018; Yui Station was assigned station number CA13.

Passenger statistics
In fiscal 2017, the station was used by an average of 2,184 passengers daily (boarding passengers only).

Surrounding area
Seiken-ji
Okitsu Elementary School
Okitsu Junior High School

See also
 List of Railway Stations in Japan

References

Yoshikawa, Fumio. Tokaido-sen 130-nen no ayumi. Grand-Prix Publishing (2002) .

External links

Official home page

Railway stations in Japan opened in 1889
Tōkaidō Main Line
Stations of Central Japan Railway Company
Railway stations in Shizuoka (city)